Chris Ward (born June 27, 1960 in The Bronx) is an American country music singer. A former police officer and bull rider, Ward signed to Giant Records in 1994. After recording demos, he wrote Confederate Railroad's 1995 single "See Ya".

Ward released his debut single "Fall Reaching" in 1996. Written by Robert Ellis Orrall and Josh Leo, and originally recorded by Orrall in the duo Orrall & Wright, the song received a favorable review from Billboard, whose Deborah Evans Price said that it "should go a long way toward helping Ward get through the clutter of competition at country radio." The song spent two weeks on the Hot Country Songs charts, peaking at number 68.

Stroud and Dann Huff co-produced Ward's debut album One Step Beyond. This album included the song "Only God (Could Stop Me Loving You)", co-written by Robert John "Mutt" Lange. Eric Zehnbauer of Country Standard Time gave the album a mostly-negative review, saying that it "shows too much of the cookie-cutter sameness that has plagued the recent 'hat act' stampede." Zehnbauer's review praised "Fall Reaching" and the up-tempo songs. "When You Get to Be You" was covered by Lisa Brokop on her 1998 album of the same name.

Discography

One Step Beyond (1996)

Singles

Music videos

References

1960 births
American country singer-songwriters
American male singer-songwriters
Giant Records (Warner) artists
Living people
Musicians from the Bronx
Singer-songwriters from New York (state)
Country musicians from New York (state)